At the 1960 Winter Olympics, eight speed skating events were contested in Squaw Valley, California. For the first time in Olympic history, women participated in the Olympic speed skating events after the USOC's proposal to include the women's events was approved by the IOC. The competitions were held from Saturday, February 20, to Tuesday, February 23, 1960 (women), and from Wednesday, February 24, to Saturday, February 27, 1960 (men).

Medal summary

Men

Women

Participating nations

104 Athletes from seventeen nations competed in the speed skating events at Squaw Valley. Out of 249 entries, 8 did not finish and 1 got disqualified.

Medal table

References

External links
International Olympic Committee results database
1960 VIII Olympic Games Final Report
 
 

 
1960 Winter Olympics events
1960
Olympics, 1960